David Gainey Clarke (30 August 1908 – 18 April 2004) was an American Broadway and motion picture actor.

Life and career 
A native of Chicago and graduate of Butler University, Clarke started his career as a stage actor during the 1930s. He made his first film Knockout (1941). The actor remains perhaps best known for his film noir roles as a character actor during the 1940s and 1950s. He also played at the Biltmore Theatre in Los Angeles and was featured on Broadway in the original productions of A View from the Bridge, Orpheus Descending, The Ballad of the Sad Cafe, Inquest, and The Visit. On television, Clarke appeared as Abel Bingley on The Waltons and as Tiso Novotny in the soap opera Ryan's Hope.

David Clarke lived in Belmont, Ohio for several years until he sold his house and moved to Arlington, Virginia to be with his daughters. He later died in Virginia from pneumonia in 2004, aged 95 years. He was married to Nora Dunfee, with whom he had two daughters.

Filmography (selection)

 Knockout (1941) - Peters, a Fighter (uncredited)
 Million Dollar Baby (1941) - First Reporter (uncredited)
 The Deadly Game (1941) - John Brandt
 A Gentleman After Dark (1942) - Bellboy
 Men of Texas (1942) - Sentry (uncredited)
 Moonlight in Havana (1942) - Second Player (uncredited)
 Foreign Agent (1942) - Carl Beck
 Reunion in France (1942) - Soldier (uncredited)
 Sweetheart of Sigma Chi (1946) - Trainer (uncredited)
 Swell Guy (1946) - Frank (uncredited)
 The Long Night (1947) - Bill Pulanski
 Killer McCoy (1947) - Pete Mariola
 State of the Union (1948) - Rusty Miller (uncredited)
 Homecoming (1948) - Sergeant (uncredited)
 Berlin Express (1948) - Army Technician (uncredited)
 Raw Deal (1948) - Police Commanding Officer (uncredited)
 The Boy with Green Hair (1948) - Barber
 Wake of the Red Witch (1948) - Mullins (uncredited)
 The Man from Colorado (1949) - Mutton McGuire (uncredited)
 The Set-Up (1949) - Gunboat Johnson
 Red Canyon (1949) - Sears
 The Doolins of Oklahoma (1949) - Dalton (uncredited)
 Illegal Entry (1949) - Carl
 Too Late for Tears (1949) - Jack Sharber (uncredited)
 Thieves' Highway (1949) - Mitch - Thug in Hat (uncredited)
 Abandoned (1949) - Harry
 Intruder in the Dust (1949) - Vinson Gowrie
 Adam's Rib (1949) - Roy (uncredited)
 Sands of Iwo Jima (1949) - Wounded Marine (uncredited)
 The Blonde Bandit (1950) - Police Lt. O'Connor
 Woman in Hiding (1950) - Moyer - Photographer / Reporter (uncredited)
 The Outriders (1950) - Ross (uncredited)
 Wabash Avenue (1950) - Workman (uncredited)
 The Gunfighter (1950) - Second Brother (uncredited)
 The Asphalt Jungle (1950) - Mr. Atkinson - Railroad Man (uncredited)
 The Lawless (1950) - Reporter in Office (uncredited)
 My Friend Irma Goes West (1950) - Bill - Deputy Sheriff (uncredited)
 A Lady Without Passport (1950) - Operator (uncredited)
 Edge of Doom (1950) - Drunken Seaman (uncredited)
 A Life of Her Own (1950) - Charlie, Taxicab Driver (uncredited)
 The Company She Keeps (1951) - Detective Barkley (uncredited)
 Only the Valiant (1951) - Guardhouse Sentry (uncredited)
 The House on Telegraph Hill (1951) - Mechanic
 As Young as You Feel (1951) - Cleveland's Chauffeur (uncredited)
 The Red Badge of Courage (1951) - Corporal by Campfire (uncredited)
 The Narrow Margin (1952) - Joseph Kemp
 Edge of the City (1957) - Wallace
 The Great St. Louis Bank Robbery (1959) - Gino
 Odds Against Tomorrow (1959) - (uncredited)
 A View from the Bridge (1962)
 The Waltons (1975-1977, TV Series) - Able Bingley 
 The Front (1976) - Hubert Jackson
 Matilda (1978) - Sheriff
 Ryan's Hope (1979-1980, TV Series) - Tiso Novotny
 Cutting Class (1989) - Crusty Old Man (final film role)

External links
 

1908 births
2004 deaths
Male actors from Chicago
American male film actors
American male stage actors
People from Arlington County, Virginia
Butler University alumni
20th-century American male actors